Lone Meertens (born 16 April 1998) is a Belgian professional racing cyclist, who currently rides for UCI Women's Continental Team . She rode in the women's road race event at the 2020 UCI Road World Championships.

References

External links

1998 births
Living people
Belgian female cyclists
Place of birth missing (living people)
21st-century Belgian women